Faber may refer to:

People 
 Faber (surname)

Companies 
 Faber and Faber (also known as "Faber and Gwyer"), publishing house in the United Kingdom
 Faber-Castell, German manufacturer of writing instruments
 Faber Music, British sheet music publisher
 Eberhard Faber, German art supply manufacturer best known (in the United States) by their brand of pencil and eraser

In fiction 
 Faber College, fictional school providing the setting for the movie National Lampoon's Animal House
 Faber (Fahrenheit 451), character in Ray Bradbury's science fiction novel Fahrenheit 451

Places 
 Faber, Virginia, a community in the United States
 Mount Faber, second highest peak in Singapore

Other uses 
 Faber, pseudonym of the Italian singer-songwriter Fabrizio De André
 Faber (EP), a 2006 EP by Faber Drive
 Faber (grape), grape variety also known as Faberrebe
 FABER test (Flexion Abduction External Rotation), a test for evidence of hip arthritis
 Faber Towers, landmark in Kuala Lumpur, Malaysia